The sixth cycle of Britain's Next Top Model, premiered on 5 July 2010 on Sky Living. This cycle featured a completely revamped judging panel. Host Lisa Snowdon was replaced by model Elle Macpherson. The new judging panel consisted of fashion designer Julien McDonald, fashion stylist Grace Woodward, and male model Charley Speed.

The prizes for this cycle included a modelling contract with Models 1, a fashion spread and cover feature in Company magazine, and a £100,000 contract with Revlon cosmetics, which included a photo shoot for the company's Colorburst Lipstick and campaigns posing as the face of Revlon's Autumn/Winter 2010 trend collection launching in the UK in November.

The winner of the competition was 18-year-old Tiffany Pisani, from the island country of Malta. Pisani beat fellow contestants Alisha White and Joy Mclaren in a public vote during a live finale, a first for Britain's Next Top Model. She is the first and only non-British winner.

Runner-up Alisha White participated as a contestant on America's Next Top Model Cycle 18 along with six other former BNTM contestants. White quit the competition in the tenth episode explaining that she did not want to take the opportunity away from girls who wanted to be there more than her, and that she had lost her spirit. This marked the first time in ANTM history that more than one contestant decided to quit during the same season as former BNTM Cycle 3 runner-up Louise Watts quit in the third episode initially. 

It was revealed that Amelia Thomas was supposed to take part as a contestant on ANTM as the eighth former BNTM Contestant. However, due to stress and other factors, Amelia withdrew before the competition aired.

Cast

Contestants
(Ages stated are at start of contest)

Judges
Elle Macpherson (host)
Charley Speed
Grace Woodward
Julien Macdonald

Episodes

Episode 5
Original Airdate: 2 August 2010

The girls shot a TV ad for Beyoncé's new fragrance for the challenge. Kirsty won the challenge and a night out and chose Nicola and Amelia to join her. Charlotte seemed disappointed by this, but didn't act upon her disappointment. The girls had a photo shoot for covered in chocolate with nude for a body product shop campaign. Nicola's photo was the favourite of the company director, thus earning her the first call-out. Delita and Tiffany were announced as the bottom two, Delita for producing her only good photograph, but overall the weakest film, and Tiffany for what seemed to be a lack of versatility. Tiffany's previous strong performances spared her and an unsurprised Delita was sent home.

Featured photographer: Rhys Frampton
Special guests: Beyoncé (In a video message), Olivia Fletcher, Dave Berry, Karl Plewka, Lorraine Clough, Rachel Higgin, Rihanna

Episode 6
Original Airdate: 9 August 2010

The remaining girls arrived in Birmingham to be greeted by R'n'B singer Alesha Dixon with a challenge to sell her latest brand of jewellery live on TV. After an hour of practicing, the girls were thrown in the deep end and presented on GemsTV. Charlotte was initially nervous but Alesha stated she was a natural, Alisha used her energetic and bubbly personality to sell the products, Tiffany was extremely nervous at first but decided she wanted to smile and focus more on looking friendly than messing up. However, it was Joy who felt the full brunt of presenting on live TV and she sadly succumbed to nervousness and swore twice. The girls were then taken to Gatwick Airport to be greeted by Grace who gave them £500 each to shop around the airport before they were jetted off to Alicante, Spain for a swimsuit photo shoot. At judging, Amba and Nicola were in the bottom two. In the end, a shocked Amba was eliminated in a very emotional elimination.

Featured photographer: Javier Galue
Special guests: Alesha Dixon, Angeline Davies, Melissa Odabash

Episode 7
Original Airdate: 16 August 2010

This week the girls went to the location and set of Hollyoaks for an acting challenge. Joy won and was given a speaking part in an episode and a night out with two cast members.  She chose to take Alisha as well. The main photo shoot was a Horror-based Scream Queens shoot, featuring the girls in horror situations.

At Panel Most of the girls excelled, especially Olivia, gaining her first call-out. The judges felt that Nicola's photo was not as strong as her previous photos, even though it was a decent shot, and deemed Amelia's photo as "super fake" and she was told to get real and to not just focus on her beauty at shoots. Despite the comments from the judges that seemed to imply that Amelia would be sent packing, Nicola was eliminated despite having 2 first call-outs. Amelia's levels of versatility, personality and modelling ability seemed to be ignored, a decision that many fans of the show disliked, and Nicola was sent home as she was deemed to be forgettable in the personality department and her photos were declining as the competition progressed.

Featured photographer: Matthew Brindle
Special guests: Ricky Whittle, Bronagh Waugh, Hollie-Jay Bowes, Melissa Walton, Kevin Sacre, Paul Marquess, Nathalie Emmanuel, Jessica Fox, Rachel Hardy, Penny Shales, Stuart Russell

Episode 8
Original Airdate: 23 August 2010

This week, the girls did a challenge on the high street. They had to pick clothes from a store and present them on camera. Charlotte won the challenge for welcoming and friendly presenting skills. The judges of the challenge didn't like Olivia's choice of clothes because they were too revealing and risque.

When they arrived home, they were told they were going to Norway. Once they had arrived they embarked on a helicopter ride to a glacier which they did their photo shoots wearing outfits created from plastic bottles. The best photo would win a campaign with their photo.

At the photo shoot, it was -5 degrees. Alisha and Kirsty worried about the cold. This then led to Alisha struggling with the cold in her photo shoot. Tiffany also struggled with the cold and it proved a big challenge for everyone. the photographer was disappointed with Tiffany who seemed to have the attitude that she wanted to just get it over with.

At panel, Charlotte is told she won the campaign. Tiffany's attitude comes up at panel. Olivia and Joy don't do well. The judges feel Kirsty is constantly producing only amateur photos. The judges thought Alisha's body and her face just weren't working together. Amelia, however, told that her photo was amazing and a very nice bounce back after last week's atrocious photo.

During elimination, Amelia was told she would've been called first if Charlotte had not won the campaign, so she was called second. Alisha and Kirsty find themselves in the bottom two, and a not-so-surprised Kirsty is eliminated.

Featured photographer: Ole Marius Fossen
Special guests: Steph Theobold, Charlotte Carey, Peter Krogh, Stephen Jones, Giles Deacon

Episode 9
Original Airdate: 30 August 2010

The girls have to do a beauty shot for Revlon which piles on the pressure as the show's eventual winner will be given a Revlon campaign. Then the girls are reaching new heights as they perform in a falling photo shoot for Galaxy Ripple which pushes some girls, especially Amelia and Olivia, to the limit. After Amelia received injury taking part in the shoot and she called an ambulance, Olivia became scared and could not do the jump, resulting in the decision that she should not take part in the shoot.

At panel, nobody managed to do well on both shoots. Amelia and Charlotte are lauded for strong beauty shot, but their campaign photo weren't amazing, just good. Alisha was praised for perfect beauty shot, but her horrible campaign photo turns the judges down. Tiffany and Joy failed to do well on both shoots, while Olivia didn't do the campaign shoot, her beauty shot was horrible as well. In the end, Alisha shockingly called first, ahead of Amelia and Charlotte, but Tiffany and Olivia find themselves in the bottom two. Tiffany was spared and Olivia was sent home.

Featured photographer: Hugh O'Malley, Neale Haynes 
Special guests: Sarah Harper, Jim Dowdall,

Episode 10
Original Airdate: 6 September 2010

The tables turn on the final five when Nicky Johnston sets them a challenge to be the photographer on a shoot based in their model house. Then the girls have to perform a relaxed yet sexy photo shoot with George Lamb, before being photographed with a rugby team by legendary Terry O'Neill. Amelia, Joy and Tiffany were praised for both their photo's, Alisha managed to produce a phenomenal photo with George Lamp but her wasp shot was considered a miss, Charlotte's wasp shot on the other hand received strong positive criticism but her photo with George Lamp was too commercial, At elimination, Elle says for Charlotte and Joy to both pack their bags, because they (as well as the other three girls) are going overseas to Malaysia, meaning that no one would be eliminated.

Featured photographer: Simon Lipman, Terry O'Neill  
Special guests: Nicky Johnston, George Lamb, Victoria White, Kirsty Hathaway,

Episode 11
Original Airdate: 13 September 2010

The girls reach Kuala Lumpur and meet with famous designer Jimmy Choo. They then take part in a dancing challenge, followed by a roof top photo shoot for Baby G watches. One girl will be picked to represent the brand following the end of Pixie Lott's contract with the company.

Amelia was told her photo was stunning on its own, but the judges are concerned about her progress during the competition (as she started strong, but then tumbled down until she's getting better and better). Charlotte and Alisha's photo was universally criticized, but Tiffany's photo was heavily praised. Joy received the best feedback, but Amelia and Charlotte ended up in the bottom two again, though both of them produced the two best photos of the week.

Though she has progressed tremendously the past few weeks, Amelia was eliminated.

Special guests: Jimmy Choo, Datin Azanin Dato' Ahmad, Sarah Earlam, Dato' Sri Dr Ng Yen Yen

Episode 12
Original Airdate: 20 September 2010

The girls did a commercial for Tourism Malaysia introducing Durian and fish spa. The next day, they have their go-see challenge around Kuala Lumpur meeting three top Malaysian fashion designers. The girls shot this week's photo shoot in the heart of Bukit Cahaya, the shots will appear in a top high society magazine in Malaysia. Malaysian Fashion Designer Bernard Chandran joins panel this week, Elle announces that 3 girls will be walking in London Fashion Week 2010 in Bernard Chandran's design.

Featured director: Juan Zainal
Featured photographer: Allan Casal
Special guests: Faisol Abdullah, Tom Abang Saufi, Carven Ong, Bernard Chandran

Episode 13
Original Airdate: 27 September 2010

The girls received an E-mail telling them to pack their bags for the following morning, where they were taken to Pangkor Laut Resort on Pangkor Island. There, they were treated to massages and a sunset cruise before meeting with Elle the next morning. She gave each girl an iconic photo from her archive which they would have to reproduce for their last photo shoot. Upon returning to Kuala Lumpur, the girls then had to prepare for their catwalk finale in Dato Bernard Chandran's fashion show. During judging, Elle mentioned that she could not choose and revealed to the girls that they would be participating in a show-first, a live finale back in Britain.

Featured photographer: Aaron Lee
Special guests: Bernard Chandran, Andrew Tan

Episode 14: Live Finale
Original Airdate: 4 October 2010

The show came to a massive end, as the final three took to the final show. There were live performances from McFly, The Saturdays and Tinchy Stryder. After the first round of votes were counted, it was decided that Joy would finish in third.

With Joy now eliminated, the final two, Tiffany and Alisha, took to a final, live runway, with alumni of previous cycles Britain's Next Top Model, including Cycle 1, 3, 4 and 5 winners, Lucy Ratcliffe, Lauren McAvoy, Alex Evans and Mecia Simson, as well as Cycle 5 runners-up, Sophie Sumner and Jade McSorley. After this, the final votes were counted, and Tiffany was revealed to be the winner of the competition.

Special guests: Dave Berry, McFly, The Saturdays, Tinchy Stryder, Lucy Ratcliffe, Lauren McAvoy, Alex Evans, Mecia Simson, Sophie Sumner, Jade McSorley, Sarah Harper

Results

 The contestant quit the competition
 The contestant was eliminated
 The contestant was eliminated outside the judging panel
 The contestant was part of a non-elimination bottom two
 The contestant won the competition

Average  call-out order
Final two is not included.

Bottom two

 The contestant was eliminated after her first time in the bottom two
 The contestant was eliminated after her second time in the bottom two
 The contestant was eliminated after her third time in the bottom two
 The contestant quit the competition
 The contestant was eliminated in the final judging and placed third
 The contestant was eliminated in the final judging and placed as the runner-up

Ratings
Episode Viewing figures from BARB

Notes

References

06
2010 British television seasons
Television shows filmed in England
Television shows filmed in Spain
Television shows filmed in Norway
Television shows filmed in Malaysia